Frederick Miller Cahoon (November 26, 1876 – September 13, 1945) was an American football, basketball, and baseball coach. He served as head coach in all three sports between 1913 and 1920 at Texas Christian University (TCU), where was also school's director of bands.

Head coaching record

Football

References

External links
 

1876 births
1945 deaths
TCU Horned Frogs baseball coaches
TCU Horned Frogs football coaches
TCU Horned Frogs men's basketball coaches
Sportspeople from Texas